Half Pipe is a steel shuttle roller coaster located at Elitch Gardens in Denver, Colorado. The launched roller coaster was manufactured by Intamin and designed by Werner Stengel. It opened to the public on May 27, 2004. An identical installation opened a year earlier at Särkänniemi in Tampere, Finland, but was closed in 2019.

Riders are placed in one of two cars on the train which is made to resemble a giant skateboard. Each car is a free-spinning circle that holds eight people. The track is in the shape of an upright "U", and riders board at the base of the track. LIM engines accelerate the train up both sides of the track. A ride cycle consists of approximately five to six cycles of the train traveling through the track.

A third Half Pipe installation, identical to the others, was built on top of the Don Quijote store in Roppongi, Tokyo. It was completed in December 2005 but never opened, and it remained standing until its removal in 2017–2018.

On November 13, 2019, the Särkänniemi version was reported as not reopening for the 2020 season.

References

External links

Half Pipe at Särkänniemi at the Roller Coaster DataBase
Half Pipe at Elitch Gardens at the Roller Coaster DataBase

Elitch Gardens Theme Park
Roller coasters manufactured by Intamin
Roller coasters in Colorado
Roller coasters introduced in 2004
Steel roller coasters
Roller coasters operated by Herschend Family Entertainment
Amusement rides that closed in 2019